I Hora Ton Thavmaton (Greek: Η Χώρα Των Θαυμάτων; English: The Land Of Miracles) is a studio album by Greek artist Glykeria. It was released in 1992 by the WEA Greece.

Track listing 
 "Kai Oti Po" (Anything I say) – 3:26
 "Fisa Vardari Mou" – 2:42
 "Ego Kai O Ponos Mou" (Me and my pain) – 3:28
 "Leili Leili" – 3:01
 "Mehri Na Vroume Ourano" (Until we find the skies) – 3:14
 "Pou Pas Aliki" (Where are you going Aliki) – 5:36
 "Gia Tin Ellada" (For Greece) – 3:50
 "Otan Vrehei Se Thimamai" (When it rains I remember you) – 3:52
 "San Vanilia" (Like vanilla) – 3:18
 "Ksafnika Mia Vradia" (Suddenly one evening) – 3:08
 "12 Theoi" (12 Gods) – 4:00
 "Klefta Klefta" (Sly sly) – 3:36
 "Gia Tin Ellada" (For Greece) [Extended Version] – 4:45

Music videos
 "Gia Tin Ellada"
 "Fisa Vardari Mou"
 "Mehri Na Vroume Ourano
 "Ego ki o ponos mou"

1992 albums
Glykeria albums
Greek-language albums